Natalia Osińska is a Polish writer of young adult literature. Her novels describe the lives of Polish LGBTQ youth.

Osińska graduated from the Faculty of Polish and Classical Philology at the Adam Mickiewicz University in Poznań, Poland. Her literary debut was the novel Fanfik, which was listed on the 2016 List of Treasures by the Museum of Children's Books in Poland. The sequel, published in 2017, is titled Slash.

Works
 Fanfik (Krytyka Polityczna 2016)
 Slash (Agora SA 2017)

References

Living people
21st-century Polish novelists
Writers from Poznań
Polish women novelists
Writers of young adult literature
21st-century Polish women writers
Year of birth missing (living people)